Ezeleke is a village, also known as umunne asaa (a village which is organized around patrilineage) and located in Abia state, Nigeria.  The village leader, titled President General of the Ezeleke community is Gideon Nwosu.

References 

Populated places in Abia State